The Kentucky Department of Juvenile Justice  (KYDJJ) is a state agency of Kentucky headquartered in unincorporated Franklin County, near Frankfort. The agency operates juvenile correctional facilities.

It was established after a 1996 act of the Kentucky General Assembly.

Facilities

Regional Juvenile Detention Centers
 Adair Regional Juvenile Detention Center (ARJDC), Columbia
 Boyd Regional Juvenile Detention Center, (BRJDC), Ashland
 Breathitt Regional Youth Detention Center (BRYDC), Jackson
 Campbell Regional Juvenile Detention Center (CRJDC), Newport
 Fayette Regional Juvenile Detention Center (FRJDC), Lexington
 Jefferson Regional Juvenile Detention Center (JRJDC), Louisville

 McCracken Regional Juvenile Detention Center (MRJDC), Paducah
 Warren Regional Juvenile Detention Center (WRJDC), Bowling Green

Youth Development Centers
These are places for adjudicated (convicted of juvenile crimes) youth who are to be treated.
 Adair Youth Development Center, Columbia
 Houses up to 80 boys and girls
 Green River Youth Development Center, Cromwell
 Lake Cumberland Youth Development Center, Monticello
 Mayfield Youth Development Center, Mayfield
 Morehead Youth Development Center, Morehead
 Houses only girls: they are incarcerated for more minor crimes, such as truancy, and more serious ones, such as murder.
 Northern Kentucky Youth Development Center, Crittenden
 Owensboro Treatment Center, Owensboro
 Woodsbend Youth Development Center, West Liberty

Cadet Leadership & Education Program
 Cadet Leadership & Education Program (CLEP), Jackson

Group Homes
 Ashland Group Home, Ashland
 Bowling Green Group Home, Bowling Green
 Burnside Group Home, Burnside
 Frankfort Group Home, Frankfort
 Frenchburg Group Home, Denniston
 Hopkinsville Group Home, Hopkinsville
 London Group Home, London
 Middlesboro Group Home, Middlesboro
 Murray Group Home, Murray
 Westport Group Home, Louisville

Day Treatment Centers
 Ashland Day Treatment Center, Boyd County, Ashland
 Breathitt Day Treatment Center, Breathitt County, Breathitt
 Christian County Day Treatment Center, Christian County, Hopkinsville
 Hardin County Day Treatment Center, Hardin County,  Elizabethtown
 Louisville Day Treatment Center, Jefferson County, Louisville
 Owensboro Day Treatment Center,  Daviess County, Owensboro

source:

References

Further reading
 "Kentucky's 2014 Juvenile Justice Reform" (Archive). Pew Charitable Trusts, July 2014.

External links

 

Juvenile Justice
Juvenile detention centers in the United States
State corrections departments of the United States
1996 establishments in Kentucky
Government agencies established in 1996